Gia Nghĩa Camp (also known as Gia Nghĩa Special Forces Camp) is a former U.S. Army and Army of the Republic of Vietnam (ARVN) base east of Gia Nghĩa, Dak Nong Province, in the Central Highlands of Vietnam.

History
The 5th Special Forces Group first established a base here in 1966. The base was located 5 km east of Gia Nghĩa. Advisory Team 32, Military Assistance Command, Vietnam was based at Gia Nghĩa.

On 12 February 1968, Bell UH-1H Iroquois #66-17027 crashed on a night medevac mission to Gia Nghĩa, the four crewmen were missing presumed killed.

On 17 December 1969 a USAF Fairchild C-123K Provider #55-4562 crashed on landing at Gia Nghĩa resulting in one fatality.

On 22 March 1975 Gia Nghĩa came under artillery and then ground attack from the PAVN 271B Regiment, after two days of fighting the PAVN captured the town.

Current use
The base has been turned over to farmland.

References

Installations of the United States Army in South Vietnam
Buildings and structures in Dak Nong Province